Ahmed Musa Ibero is a Nigerian politician for the Peoples Democratic Party. He was a minister during the Shagari Administration.

References

Living people
Federal ministers of Nigeria
Nigerian prisoners and detainees
Prisoners and detainees of Nigeria
Year of birth missing (living people)
Place of birth missing (living people)
Peoples Democratic Party (Nigeria) politicians